The Diocese of Eluru comprises the whole of West Godavari district and the Mandals of Amalapuram, Kothapeta, Rajole and Mummidivaram of East Godavari in Andhra Pradesh, India. This territory was formed from the Roman Catholic Diocese of Vijayawada and was  erected into a Diocese by Pope Paul VI on 9 December 1976.

Bishops
John Mulagada (5 May 1977 – 16 August 2009)
Jaya Rao Polimera (25 July 2013–present)

Saints and causes for canonisation
 Servant of God Fr. Silvio Pasquali, PIME

Notes

Roman Catholic dioceses in India
Christian organizations established in 1976
Roman Catholic dioceses and prelatures established in the 20th century
1976 establishments in Andhra Pradesh
Christianity in Andhra Pradesh
East Godavari district
West Godavari district